The Beijing International Ice Hockey League (BIIHL) is a non-professional ice hockey league based in Beijing. Most of the players are expatriates and come from all around the world. Since the beginning of the 2008-09 season, the league plays all games at the Beijing Hosa rink (Chaoyang District, Beijing).

The Beijing International Ice Hockey League is managed by the Beijing International Ice Hockey Group which also proposes some youth hockey, and other events related to ice hockey in Asia. It is a private league and has official relationship with the Chinese Ice Hockey Association.

The Beijing International Ice Hockey Group is a non-profit organization whose aim is to provide fun and friendship through a common passion: ice hockey.

Teams
The Beijing International Ice Hockey League has 6 teams. In order to face the International Ice Hockey boom in Beijing, the Warriors were created in the beginning of the 2009-10 season.

Other events

In Beijing
The Beijing Expat Cup have been first time organized in 2007. Dalian team won the first edition. Several international teams from all China and Mongolia gathered for the opened 2008 edition which have been won by the Icehogs.

While the Beijing International Ice Hockey League is composed with a significant number of players from Asian origins, only a few players really holds the Chinese nationality. However, in an effort to see more competitive ice hockey games in Beijing, executive George Smith organized series against some local Chinese players during Spring 2009. The international team was composed with some invited players from the Beijing International Ice Hockey League, and the Chinese team was composed with ex-national Chinese team players living in Beijing and ex-pro players from both defunct Hosa and Nordic Vikings. The international team won the 2009 series.

Outside of Beijing
Many tours have been organized all around Asia in Dubai, Hong Kong, Bangkok, etc. In autumn of 2008, the Beijing International Ice Hockey Group travelled to North Korea to play against local teams.

The Beijing International Ice Hockey Group also supports ice hockey development in Mongolia, and helps to organize an outdoor international tournament in Ulan Bator traditionally standing during the Chinese New Year Festival.

Beijing International Ice Hockey Champions

See also
China Dragon
Nordic Vikings

References
"www.beijinghockey.com"
Article in China Daily

External links
Beijing International Ice Hockey - Official site
"www.chinadaily.com.cn/cndy/2009-02/09/content_7455131.htm" -  Article in China Daily
Chinese Ice Hockey association

Ice hockey competitions in China
Ice hockey leagues in Asia